Dilawar Cheema Kalan is a village founded in 1297 by Dilawer Cheema. It has a population of approximately 10,000 people, and an area of 5000 acres. It is 22 km from Wazir Abad. In the era of the British Empire, it was a zail. The major crops of the village are rice and wheat.

References

Cities and towns in Punjab, India